Girma Wolde-Giorgis (28 December 1924 – 15 December 2018) was an Ethiopian politician who was the president of Ethiopia from 2001 to 2013. He was the second person to hold the office of president since the founding of the Federal Democratic Republic of Ethiopia in 1995.

Early life 
Girma was born on 28 December 1924 in Addis Ababa. He first attended an Ethiopian Orthodox Church school and later joined the Teferi Mekonnen School in Addis Ababa where he followed his education until the Italian invasion. The school was then renamed Scuola Principe di Piemonte (Prince of Piedmonte School) for the Crown Prince of Italy.

Between 1950 and 1952, he received certificates in management (from the Netherlands), in air traffic management (in Sweden) and air traffic control (in Canada) under a training programme sponsored by the International Civil Aviation Organization (ICAO). He was one of the first Ethiopians in the Ethiopian Air Force, which had been dominated by American technicians. Girma tried to motivate Ethiopians to join the airlines and wrote a book on fundamentals. He was an activist and at the Inter Parliamentary Summit in Yugoslavia, he condemned the apartheid system in South Africa. Girma spoke Afan Oromo (Oromiffa), Amharic, and English fluently.

Political career 

Girma was elected president on 8 October 2001, as a relatively unknown and a surprising choice, by a unanimous vote of the Ethiopian Parliament. The Ethiopian presidency is largely a symbolic office with little power. Most of the power is vested in the hands of the prime minister. Presidents serve two six-year terms. He was re-elected as president on 9 October 2007.

Personal life 

Girma was from the Oromo ethnic group. He was married and had five children. He was a member of the Ethiopian Orthodox Tewahedo Church. He was widely renowned for his usual presence at Ethiopian Orthodox Tewahedo Church Meskel Demera Festivals.

Girma died of natural causes on 15 December 2018, 13 days before his 94th birthday.

Government service 

 1941: Enlisted at the Ethiopian Military Radio Communication set up by the United Kingdom
 1944: Graduated from the Holetta Military Academy as a sub-lieutenant
 1946: Joined the Air Force in and took various air management courses
 1948: Became assistant teacher in air navigation and flight control
 1951: Became director general of the Ministry of Trade, Industry and Planning at its establishment
 1955: Became head of Civil Aviation of Eritrea (Eritrea, at the time, was part of the Federation of Ethiopia and Eritrea)
 1957: Assumed the post of director general of the Ethiopian Civil Aviation Authority and was board member of the Ethiopian Airlines during the same period.
 1961: Became member of the lower house (Chamber of Deputies) of the Imperial Ethiopian Parliament
 Elected speaker of the lower house (Chamber of Deputies) of the Imperial Ethiopian Parliament for three consecutive years.
 Helped win a seat for the Ethiopian Parliament in the International Parliamentary Union and attended conferences of the IPU in Switzerland, Denmark and former Yugoslavia and was elected as vice president of the 52nd Meeting of the International Parliamentary Union.
 Served as manager of the Import and Export Enterprise (IMPEX).
 Served as deputy commissioner of the Peace Programme drawn up in 1977 by the provisional military government of Ethiopia (Derg) to settle the Eritrean problem peacefully.
 2000: Became member of the House of Peoples' Representatives of the Federal Democratic Republic of Ethiopia (FDRE) after winning in the Becho woreda constituency, Mirab Shewa Zone of the Oromia Region, as an independent candidate in the second round elections

Experience in non-governmental offices 

Between 1965 and 1974:

 Board member of the Ethiopian Chamber of Commerce
 Representative for Australian Trade Mission in Ethiopia
 Founder and director of the Ghibe Agricultural Association
 Founder and director of the Keffa and Illubabor Timber Processing Industry

While in the then province of Eritrea before 1990:

 President of the Ethiopian Red Cross Society – Eritrea Branch (Asmara)
 Board president of Cheshire Home
 Managing director of Leprosy Control Organization

Upon returning to Addis Ababa in 1990, he served as board member of the Ethiopian Red Cross Society and head of its International Logistics Department.

He launched an environmental protection association called Lem Ethiopia in March 1992 and has severed as its vice president.

Two days before Ethiopian Christmas, on 5 January 2014 he made a clear statement on Ethiopia TV, calling for pacification between Ethiopia and Eritrea, calling it his last personal task and fight. He is coordinating from his office a group of people trying to launch peace talks, after fifteen years of disagreements, culminating in the Eritrean–Ethiopian War of 1998–2000.

Official biography 
Indian author Sivakumar K.P. has produced the official biography of Girma Wolde Giorgis. The book, Under the Shade of a Gaashe, was released on 15 July 2015 at the official residence of the former president. Micro Business College is the publisher of the Ethiopian edition. The author acknowledges the role of Abera Tilahun, founder and president of Micros Business College in Ambo in introducing him to the former president and financing the publishing of the book.

References

External links
The Life of Girma Wolde Giorgis

1924 births
2018 deaths
Ethiopian Air Force personnel
Ethiopian Orthodox Christians
Ethiopian Oriental Orthodox Christians
Oromo people
Ethiopian People's Revolutionary Democratic Front politicians
Members of the House of Peoples' Representatives
People from Addis Ababa
Presidents of Ethiopia